PT Sumber Alfaria Trijaya Tbk or Alfamart is a primarily-franchised Indonesian convenience store chain. As of May 2021, it had over 17,000 stores spread across Indonesia, 4 million daily customers and tens of thousands of micro, small and medium-scale business partners. Alfamart also has about 1,000 outlets in the Philippines. The business was started in December 1989 as a trading and distribution company in Jakarta by its president, Djoko Susanto. Ten years later, Susanto ventured into the convenience store category with Alfa Minimart, with a first branch in Karawaci, Tangerang, Banten. Later renamed as Alfamart, the convenience store brand has since expanded to the Philippines, with its first Philippine branch located in Trece Martires, Cavite.

History

Djoko Susanto and his family established a trading and distribution company that sold various products in Jakarta in 1989. The distribution company had its corporate share of 70% with PT HM. Sampoerna Tbk and the remaining 30% with Susanto's PT Sigmantara Alfaindo.

In 1999, Susanto ventured out into the convenience store business, branding it as Alfa Minimart. He opened his first branch at Jalan Beringin Raya, Karawaci, Tangerang, Banten. In the span of six years, Alfa Minimart grew to 1,293 branches along Java. The chain's name was later rebranded as Alfamart.

In 2006, PT HM. Sampoerna Tbk sold its shares to Susanto's PT Sigmantara Alfaindo. Susanto gained 60% of the company's shares while the remaining 40% was granted to a new shareholder, PT Mulia Prima Horizons.

In 2009, Alfamart joined the Indonesia Stock Exchange with around 3,000 branches nationwide. The business was renamed as PT Sumber Alfaria Trijaya Tbk. Soon after, Alfamart brought the Lawson stores in Indonesia while expanding from being solely in the convenience store chain business to the operation of supermarket stores with Alfamidi Mini Supermarkets.

In 2014, Alfamart had 7,000 branches in Indonesia catering to an average of 2.5 million customers daily. The company reported over 14,000 branches by the end of 2019.

After its success in Indonesia, Alfamart expanded into the neighboring country of the Philippines. Its entry into the Philippine market was made through a partnership with SM Investments Corporation, launching its first branch in Trece Martires, Cavite. In 2020, Alfamart in the Philippines started expanding into the Visayas and Mindanao regions, particularly in Cebu, Davao, Cagayan de Oro and Zamboanga. On November 11, 2020, Alfamart Philippines opened its 1000th store located in Barangay Santiago, General Trias, Cavite.

Now, the parent company of Alfamart, PT Sigmantara Alfindo or AlfaCorp, also owned the larger minimarket chain called Alfamidi which is operated by PT Midi Utama Indonesia Tbk, and Alfa Express which also serve coffee and fast food.

See also
 Convenience stores
 Indomaret
 7-Eleven
 FamilyMart
 Lawson
 Ministop
 All Day

References

External links
 
 Official Alfamart website

2009 initial public offerings
Companies based in Jakarta
Companies listed on the Indonesia Stock Exchange
Convenience stores
Convenience stores of the Philippines
Indonesian companies established in 1999
Indonesian brands
Retail companies established in 1999
Retail companies of Indonesia